Frank Jao is an American businessman in Southern California. He was born in Haiphong, Vietnam, to an ethnic Chinese father and an ethnic Vietnamese mother His family was from northern Vietnam but moved to Danang when the country was divided into communist North Vietnam and pro-American and capitalist South Vietnam in 1954.

Jao fled Vietnam in 1975 and came to the United States; he took real estate classes at Coastline Community College in Westminster, California, and went on to found Bridgecreek Development, a real estate developer in the Vietnamese American enclave of Little Saigon in Orange County, California. He developed and currently owns the Asian Garden Mall on Bolsa Avenue, which houses numerous Vietnamese shops. Aside from his business activities, Jao serves in various non-profit capacities as well. In 2005, he was appointed by George W. Bush as head of the Vietnam Education Foundation, which seeks to improve relations between the United States and Vietnam. The Le-Jao Center at his alma mater Coastline Community College is named in recognition of donations by Jao and Chieu Le, the entrepreneur and owner of the Lee's Sandwiches chain in California.

References

Year of birth missing (living people)
Living people
American people of Chinese descent
Hoa people
Vietnamese emigrants to the United States
California Republicans